The FIBA Intercontinental Cup is an international basketball competition organised by FIBA, the sport's global governing body. The champions of the competition are considered the de jure champions of the world, as representatives from all confederation can participate in the competition. 

The current competitions is played by the winners of each year's Basketball Africa League, Basketball Champions League, Basketball Champions League Americas, NBA G League and FIBA Asia Champions Cup.

Confederation records (2013–present) 
Only including modern era (2013–present) participations.In the modern era of the FIBA Intercontinental Cup, that was restored in 2013, the confederations can each send one team to the tournament.

Africa 
Since the 2022, FIBA Africa send the champions of the Basketball Africa League (BAL) to compete. As of today, a team from the BAL has yet to win a game in the competition.

Americas

Europe 
In the modern era of the Intercontinental Cup, teams representing Europe have reached the final in each year.

United States (NBA G League) 
Instead of the champions of the National Basketball Association (NBA), the champions of each year's NBA G League are participating.

List of participating clubs of the FIBA Intercontinental Cup
The following is a list of clubs that have played in or qualified for the FIBA Intercontinental Cup. Editions in bold indicate competitions won. Rows can be adjusted to national league, total number of participations by national league or club and years played. 

Real Madrid have contested the Intercontinental Cup twelve times, a record. The United States hold the record for the nation with the most different teams, with 19 teams having played in the competition.

Notelist

References 

FIBA Intercontinental Cup